Pixie is a 2020 British comedy thriller film directed by Barnaby Thompson. The film stars Olivia Cooke, Ben Hardy, Daryl McCormack, Colm Meaney, and Alec Baldwin.

The film was released in the United Kingdom on 23 October 2020 by Paramount Pictures. It received mixed reviews from critics, while Cooke's performance was praised.

Premise
A woman and two men find themselves on the run in the Irish countryside after a heist gone wrong.

Cast
 Olivia Cooke as Pixie O'Brien
 Ben Hardy as Frank
 Daryl McCormack as Harland
 Rory Fleck Byrne as Colin
 Fra Fee as Fergus
 Turlough Convery as Mickey
 Chris Walley as Daniel
 Pat Shortt as Father Doly
 Frankie McCafferty as Father McGinley
 Ned Dennehy as Seamus
 Dylan Moran as Potential Buyer
 Sebastian de Souza as Gareth
 Colm Meaney as Dermot O'Brien
 Alec Baldwin as Father Hector McGrath

Production
In August 2019, it was announced that shooting for the film had begun in Northern Ireland, with Barnaby Thompson directing. Olivia Cooke, Ben Hardy and Alec Baldwin were among the announced cast.

Release
Pixie was released in the United Kingdom on 23 October 2020 by Paramount Pictures.

Critical response
On the review aggregator website Rotten Tomatoes, the film holds an approval rating of 76% based on reviews from 55 critics, with an average rating of 6.3/10. The website's critics consensus reads, "Pixie borrows shamelessly from multiple like-minded heist thrillers; fortunately, Olivia Cooke's outstanding lead performance makes for a great getaway vehicle." Metacritic, which uses a weighted average, assigned a score of 45 out of 100, based on 8 reviews indicating "mixed or average reviews".

References

External links
 

2020 films
2020 black comedy films
2020 thriller films
2020s British films
2020s comedy thriller films
2020s English-language films
2020s heist films
British black comedy films
British comedy thriller films
British heist films
Films scored by David Holmes (musician)
Films set in Ireland
Films shot in Northern Ireland
Paramount Pictures films